Caladenia curtisepala, commonly known as short-hooded fingers, is a plant in the orchid family Orchidaceae and is endemic to south-eastern Australia. It is a ground orchid with a single hairy leaf, and a single white to cream-coloured flower with a white labellum with red bands.

Description
The back of the dorsal sepal is covered with many reddish-brown glands. The petals are lance-shaped to sickle-shaped but otherwise similar to the lateral sepals, although shorter and narrower. The mid-lobe curves forward and has stalked teeth along its edge and two rows of stalked, yellow-tipped calli in its mid-line, the calli decreasing in size towards the tip of the labellum. The column is curved and is greenish with many irregular red bands and has broad wings. Flowering occurs in August or September.

Taxonomy and naming
Caladenia curtisepala was first formally described by David L. Jones in 1991 and the description was published in Australian Orchid Research. The type specimen was collected at Mount Kuring-gai. The specific epithet (curtisepala) is derived from the Latin words curtus meaning "short" and sepalum meaning "sepal" referring to the dorsal which is smaller than in similar orchids.

Distribution and habitat
This caladenia grows in heath and low shrubland in the Central Coast of New South Wales where it grows in soil derived from Hawkesbury sandstone.

References

curtisepala
Plants described in 1991
Endemic orchids of Australia
Orchids of New South Wales
Taxa named by David L. Jones (botanist)